Subba may refer to:
 Ṣubba, the name by which adherents to Mandaeism are known in the Middle East
 Limbu people, a Kirati people of Nepal

People with the surname
 Abhaya Subba, Nepali singer-songwriter and musician
 Dinesh Subba (born 1962), Nepali composer, singer and lyricist 
 Diwash Subba (born 1989), Bhutanese footballer
 Malvika Subba (born 1981), Nepali media personality, beauty queen, actress, social activist, and entrepreneur
 Moni Kumar Subba (born 1958), Indian politician
 Nabin Subba (born 1967), Nepali film director, screenwriter and producer
 Tanka Bahadur Subba, Indian anthropologist

Film
Imaan, 1974 Indian film starring Sanjeev Kumar and Leena Chandavarkar

See also
 Subba Rao
 
 Suba (disambiguation)